Dominican Republic literature has a long and interesting history.

Authors from the Dominican Republic

Aída Cartagena Portalatín
Alfonso Rodríguez
Alfredo Fernández Simó
Andrea Evangelina Rodríguez Perozo
Angela Hernández Núñez
Angie Cruz
Arambilet
Arturo Féliz-Camilo
Blas Jiménez
Camila Henríquez Ureña
Carmen Quidiello
César Nicolás Penson
Cristino Gómez
Domingo Moreno Jimenes
Fabio Fiallo
Fernando Cabrera
Francisco Gregorio Billini
Frank Báez
Irvin Alberti
Jael Uribe
Jaime Colson
Joaquín Balaguer
José Alcántara Almánzar
José Gabriel García
Juan Bosch
Juan Delancer
Juan Esteban Ariza Mendoza
Juan Isidro Moreno
Juan Pablo Duarte
Julia Alvarez
Julio Vega Batlle
Junot Díaz
León Félix Batista
Leopoldo Minaya
Manuel del Cabral
Marcio Veloz Maggiolo
María Isabel Soldevila
Maria Montez
Mateo Morrison
Miguel D. Mena
Norberto James Rawlings
Pedro Francisco Bonó
Pedro Mir
Rámon Marrero Aristy
Raquel Cepeda
Rei Berroa
René Fortunato
Rosa Silverio
Salomé Ureña
Sócrates Nolasco
Tulio Manuel Cestero
Edgar Smith

See also

Caribbean literature
Latin American literature
Mexican literature

References

External links
</ref> 
Literature and other materials from the Dominican Republic, in the text-searchable, Open Access Digital Library of the Caribbean
Al Amor del Bohio, Tomo II by Ramón Emilio Jiménez in the Digital Library of the Caribbean
Antología Poética de Domingo Moreno Jimenes by Manuel Mora Serrano in the Digital Library of the Caribbean
Cachón by Miguel Angel Monclús in the Digital Library of the Caribbean
Cartas a Evelina by Francisco Moscoso Puello  in the Digital Library of the Caribbean
Carnavá by Angel Hernández Acosta in the Digital Library of the Caribbean
Bani, o Engracia y Antoñita by Francisco Gregorio Billini in the Digital Library of the Caribbean
Cosas Añejas by Cesar Nicolás Penson in the Digital Library of the Caribbean
Over by Rámon Marrero Aristy in the Digital Library of the Caribbean
La Fantasma de Higüey by Francisco Javier Angulo Guridi in the Digital Library of the Caribbean
Apuntes sobre la Poesía Popular y la Poesía Negra en las Antillas by Tomás Rafael Hernández Franco in the Digital Library of the Caribbean

 
Latin American literature by country
North American literature